List of the members of the Faroese Løgting in the period 1974–1978. The parliament had 26 members this period. Javnaðarflokkurin and Tjóðveldisflokkurin were the largest parties with 7 and 6 members. Fólkaflokkurin and Sambandsflokkurin had 5 members each, Sjálvstýrisflokkurin had two members and Framburðsflokkurin had one member.

References 

Løgtingið 150 – Hátíðarrit, bind 2 (2002). (PDF)

 1974
1974 in the Faroe Islands
1975 in the Faroe Islands
1976 in the Faroe Islands
1977 in the Faroe Islands
1978 in the Faroe Islands
1974–1978